Sarchil (also Romanized as Sarchīl; also known as Sarchīl Jalābī and Sarchīl Jallābī) is a village in Qaleh Qazi Rural District, Qaleh Qazi District, Bandar Abbas County, Hormozgan Province, Iran. At the 2006 census, its population was 145, in 32 families.

References 

Populated places in Bandar Abbas County